Maxime Hordies (born 13 March 1996) is a Belgian Para-cyclist who represented Belgium at the 2020 Summer Paralympics.

Career
Hordies represented Belgium in the men's road time trial H1 event at the 2020 Summer Paralympics and won a bronze medal.

References

Living people
1996 births
Belgian male cyclists
Cyclists at the 2020 Summer Paralympics
Medalists at the 2020 Summer Paralympics
Paralympic medalists in cycling
Paralympic bronze medalists for Belgium
20th-century Belgian people
21st-century Belgian people